50th Birthday Celebration Volume 6: Hemophiliac is a live album of improvised music by Mike Patton, Ikue Mori and John Zorn documenting their performance at Tonic in September 2003 as part of Zorn's month-long 50th Birthday Celebration concert series.

Reception

The Allmusic site rated the album 4 stars.

Track listing

Source:

Personnel
John Zorn – alto saxophone 
Ikue Mori – laptop electronics
Mike Patton – voice

Source:

References

Albums produced by John Zorn
Hemophiliac (band) albums
2004 live albums
Tzadik Records live albums